SM UB-149 was a German Type UB III submarine or U-boat built for the German Imperial Navy during World War I. She was commissioned into the German Imperial Navy on 22 October 1918 as UB-149 . UB-149 was surrendered to Britain in accordance with the requirements of the Armistice with Germany on 22 November 1918 and  broken up at Swansea in 1922.

Construction

She was built by AG Weser of Bremen and following just under a year of construction, launched at Bremen on 19 September 1918. UB-149 carried 10 torpedoes and was armed with a  deck gun. UB-149 had a displacement of  while surfaced and  when submerged. Her engines enabled her to travel at  when surfaced and  when submerged.

References

Notes

Citations

Bibliography 

 

German Type UB III submarines
World War I submarines of Germany
1918 ships
Ships built in Bremen (state)
U-boats commissioned in 1918